Pier Antonio Panzeri (born 6 June 1955) is an Italian politician who served as Member of the European Parliament for the North-West with the Democrats of the Left, the Democratic Party and Article One, as part of the Socialist Group, from 2004 until 2019.

In December 2022, it was reported that Panzeri had been arrested as part of an investigation into corruption and bribery during his time as an MEP alongside other staff and politicians from the Progressive Alliance of Socialists and Democrats, including then European Parliament Vice-President, Eva Kaili.

Career
Panzeri was born in Riviera d'Adda, province of  Bergamo. Between 1995 and 2003, he was General Secretary of the Metropolitan Chamber of Labour of Milan. 

From 2003 to 2004, Panzeri was responsible for European policies; he devised and carried out a humanitarian mission to Belém, Brazil, and was a promoter and organiser of events to help the civilian victims of the Yugoslav wars. He attended the General Assembly of the United Nations as an observer for Israeli-Palestinian issues.

From 1996 until 2003, Panzeri worked with the city authorities of Milan, Barcelona, and Frankfurt, in the context of an international project to compare experiences regarding economic development, immigration and welfare, and to devise a future European municipality model.

Member of the European Parliament, 2004–2019
Panzeri became a Member of the European Parliament in the 2004 elections. In parliament, he was a member of the Progressive Alliance of Socialists and Democrats group.

From 2009 until 2019, Panzeri served on the Committee on Foreign Affairs (AFET). In 2014, he also joined its Subcommittee on Human Rights (DROI). In this capacity, he was also a member of the Democracy Support and Election Coordination Group (DEG), which oversees the Parliament's election observation missions.

In addition to his committee assignments, Panzeri served as chairman of the parliament's delegation for relations with the Maghreb countries and the Arab Maghreb Union. He was previously a member of the delegations to the Parliamentary Assembly of the Mediterranean (2009-2014) and for relations with the United States (2004-2009). He was a member of the European Parliament Intergroup on Integrity (Transparency, Anti-Corruption and Organized Crime) and of the European Parliament Intergroup on LGBT Rights. He was also part of the Elie Wiesel Network of Parliamentarians for the Prevention of Genocide and Mass Atrocities and against Genocide Denial.

In 2015, Panzeri nominated Saudi blogger Raif Badawi for the Sakharov Prize for Freedom of Thought.

Founder and president of Fight Impunity
In September 2019, Panzeri founded a human rights NGO in Brussels, "Fight Impunity", and has been president of it since.

December 2022 Arrest

In December 2022 Panzeri was arrested as part of an investigation into corruption and bribery during his time as an MEP alongside other staff and politicians from the Progressive Alliance of Socialists and Democrats, including then European Parliament Vice-President, Eva Kaili. Shortly after, acting on a European arrest warrant, Italian police detained Panzeri's wife Maria Colleoni and their daughter Silvia, who are in the process of being extradited to Belgium. Eva Kaili's husband Francesco Giorgi, a former parliamentary assistant to Panzeri with whom Panzeri had founded "Fight Impunity", was also arrested.

The accusations related to "a Gulf country (influencing) the economic and political decisions of the European parliament". It was later revealed that the Persian Gulf state in question was Qatar.

On 17 January 2023 Panzeri signed a plea bargain with the Belgian Public Prosecutor's Office.

The Belgian investigations revealed that the Panzeri also received bribes, gifts and luxury trips from Morocco. As per the reports, the former Italian MEP was bribed by the North African nation for over a decade in an attempt to buy influence in the European Parliament. Panzeri was one of the major links in the EU-Morocco relations, where he also pressed for the EU Commission to allocate more funds for Morocco. Besides, Panzeri also supported Morocco’s trade and fisheries agreement. In 2014, King Mohammed VI awarded Panzeri with the third class “wissam” Alaoui for his services to Morocco.  Besides, Morocco’s ambassador to Poland, Abderrahim Atmoun had been secretly making payments to Panzeri using different NGOs. According to a report by La Libre in January 2023, the Belgian police confiscated a suitcase from Panzeri, which contained an envelope that had a logo of the United Arab Emirates’ Red Crescent.

Other activities
 European Endowment for Democracy (EED), Member of the Board of Governors (2014-2019)

Publications
 Il lavoratore fuori garanzia
 La democrazia economica

See also
2004 European Parliament election in Italy
Qatar corruption scandal at the European Parliament

References

External links

1955 births
Living people
People from Rivolta d'Adda
Politicians from the Province of Bergamo
Article One (political party) politicians
Democratic Party (Italy) politicians
Democrats of the Left politicians
Article 1 – Democratic and Progressive Movement MEPs
Democratic Party (Italy) MEPs
Democrats of the Left MEPs
MEPs for Italy 2009–2014
MEPs for Italy 2004–2009
MEPs for Italy 2014–2019
20th-century Italian people
21st-century Italian politicians